Edward Stirling (3 September 1892 – ?) was a Scottish footballer who played league football for various clubs including  Dundee United and Rochdale.

References

Rochdale A.F.C. players
Dundee F.C. players
Dundee United F.C. players
Arbroath F.C. players
Scottish footballers
Footballers from Dundee
1892 births
Year of death missing
Association footballers not categorized by position